is a Japanese manga series written by Tsugumi Ohba and illustrated by Takeshi Obata. It was serialized in Shueisha's Jump Square monthly magazine from November 2015 to January 2021, with its chapters collected in 14 tankōbon volumes. The series follows Mirai Kakehashi, a student who attempts suicide but is rescued by his guardian angel, Nasse, who not only has vowed to protect him, but bestows him special powers as he is also one of 13 candidates chosen by different angels to take the role of God, who is to retire in 999 days. Platinum End is licensed by Viz Media in North America. A 24-episode anime television series adaptation by Signal.MD aired from October 2021 to March 2022.

Plot
Mirai Kakehashi is a young orphaned high school student who lives with his abusive aunt and uncle after the death of his parents. One day, Mirai decides he cannot take it anymore and attempts suicide, but is saved by a Guardian Angel called Nasse, who also gives Mirai special powers. Upon learning from Nasse that his aunt and uncle were responsible for the deaths of his father and mother due to their jealousy and hatred toward to them, Mirai uses the powers that she bestowed to him in order to enact justice upon them. This is only the beginning of Mirai’s story, however, as Nasse soon after informs him that God will retire in 999 days and thirteen candidates to replace him were selected, one of which is Mirai. To make matters worse, not only is Mirai forced to take part in the contest to decide the next God, but some of the other candidates will do anything to win, including killing all of the other candidates as soon as possible. To combat these ruthless killers, Mirai forms an alliance with several candidates who share his goal: to win the contest without killing any other competitors.

Characters

Main

He was raised by his abusive uncle and aunt after his family were killed in a car crash. The abuse he endured resulted in him trying to commit suicide by throwing himself from a tower block, but he is saved by Nasse. Using the arrows he discovers that his uncle and aunt murdered his family, he accidentally kills his aunt and then makes his uncle turn himself in. Upon learning of Metropoliman's plans, Mirai joins forces with Saki and Nanato to stop him, not only to protect themselves, but to prevent him from becoming God as well.

Mirai's angel. All angels bestow special abilities on their hosts and based on their rank, the abilities they bestow vary. Nasse is a special-rank angel, granting Mirai all three angel abilities including wings which grants Mirai the ability to fly, a white arrow that allows the user to instantly kill anyone it hits, and a red arrow that allows the user to make whoever it hits fall in love with them for 33 days, though not if the target is already under the influence of another user's red arrow. Her main desire is to make Mirai happy. Despite having a cute face, she has the habit of making some cruel remarks.

Saki is Mirai's classmate, his love interest, and coincidentally, a God candidate as well. Once she learns that he does not intend to kill her, Saki teams up with Mirai to deal with Metropoliman. Saki and Mirai were once childhood friends, but after his parents' death, Mirai became the target of bullying from his classmates and Saki did nothing to stop them out of peer pressure. She witnessed Mirai's suicide attempt in the beginning of the series, and out of guilt, she also did so by trying to drown herself on the sea, leading her to meet Revel and become a God candidate.

Saki's angel. He is rather calculating and manipulative, a trait that is considered by Nasse to be the reason why he was relegated to be second-rank angel, thus capable only of bestowing Saki with the red arrow. Once he decides to become more useful to Saki, Revel decides to study the knowledge of the heavens, in order to increase his rank and grant wings to Saki, but fails. However, when Revel sheds tears at not being of further use to Saki, God promotes him to first-rank and bestows him the title of "Angel of Emotion", as no angel had shed tears for a human before. This rank raise grants him the ability to bestow wings onto Saki.

God Candidates
 / 

A high school student who intends to become God by any means necessary, including killing all other candidates. He is the grandson of the principal of the prestigious Joso Academy and wishes to become God in order to bring his dead sister back to life. So far he had killed four other candidates using the alias "Metropoliman" and had claimed their wings and arrows, becoming even more dangerous upon realizing that several arrows can be combined to increase their range, and that the arrows and wings he obtained can be bestowed to other individuals to do his bidding.

A God candidate who is a failed comedian. He uses his red arrows to make women fall in love with him so that he can have sex with them. He is the first God candidate to be killed, being murdered by Kanade as Metropoliman.
 /    / 

Two God candidates who disguise themselves as different versions of Metropoliman when Kanada asks the God candidates to attend a gathering at a baseball stadium. They are friends who want to help each other after doing badly on their exams, and are saved from committing suicide by their guardian angels. However, the gathering is a trap and both are killed by the real Metropoliman.

Chiyo is the youngest God candidate. She is a young girl who was bullied at school. She attends the gathering and asks Metropoliman for help. Kanade first strikes her with a red arrow, but then uses her as a hostage, saying he will kill her if no other God candidates reveal themselves. As none do, Kanade kills Chiyo.

Nanato is a God candidate working as the product planner for an apparel company. He is suffering from terminal cancer, and first uses his red arrows to secure enough money for his family after he dies, then to hire private detectives to find more God candidates. He decides to team up with Mirai and Saki in order to prevent Kanade from becoming God, to the point of obtaining firearms from the JSDF in order to have a better chance to kill him. Mirai agrees on the grounds that Nanato continues his treatment.

Born poor and ugly, Hajime was always shunned by others until his mother commits suicide and Balta appears to become his angel. Using Balta's powers, Hajime manages to obtain money and a new, beautiful face by plastic surgery, but still is unable to attract a girl himself due to his poor communication skills. He develops an obscession with Kanade and offers to become his subordinate, which he accepts, but only in exchange of capturing another God Candidate. He then manages to discover Nanato's identity and kidnaps his wife and daughter in order to draw him to a trap. He manages to capture both Nanato and Mirai, but waiting for a chance to kill them, he ends up struck by Saki's red arrow.

Susumu Yuito is a God Candidate who has claimed to support Mirai Kakehashi and has revealed the truth about God Candidates to the public.

Shuji was a straightforward person. He greatly believed in the concept of euthanasia and that those who wish to commit suicide must have the strong desire to do so. When Ogaro selected him as her god candidate and gave him the power of the red arrows, Shuji used them to assist his parents and grandfather in suicide, first shooting them with the arrow then telling them to carry out their desires afterward.

Yoneda is a professor emeritus at Tokyo University. He was one of the youngest people to win a Nobel Prize in physics and in literature.

Angels

Kanade's angel of the special-rank, also known as the "Angel of Greed". It is said she went from unranked to special-rank for reasons unknown even to Baret

Tonma's angel of the second-rank.
  
Shogo and Saburo's angels respectively, both of the first-rank.

Chiyo's angel of the second-rank.

Nanato's angel of the first-rank, also known as the "Angel of Knowledge". She once were of the special-rank, before being demoted for flaunting her knowledge too much, according to Revel.

Hajime's angel of the first-rank, also known as the "Angel of Intuition".

Yoneda's angel of the special-rank, also known as the "Angel of Destruction".

Susumu Yuito's angel of the first-rank, also known as the "Angel of Games".

Yuri Temari's angel of the second-rank, also known as the "Angel of Truth".

Shuji Nakaumi's angel of the first-rank, also known as the "Angel of Darkness".

Others
 / 

An amateur model, her true identity is that of "Serial Killer Girl A," and she was arrested for the murder of several female middle school students. Kanade freed her and lent her a Red Arrow and Wings from the God candidates he previously eliminated in order to lay a trap for any other God candidates who might appear to stop her once she started killing again.

Media

Manga
Platinum End, written by Tsugumi Ohba and illustrated by Takeshi Obata, was serialized in Shueisha's monthly shōnen manga magazine  Jump Square from November 4, 2015, to January 4, 2021. The series' 58 individual chapters were collected into fourteen tankōbon volumes, released from February 4, 2016, to February 4, 2021. 

On October 5, 2015, Viz Media announced that they had licensed Platinum End for an English release in North America. In March 2016, Viz confirmed that they would start releasing print editions of Platinum End, with the first volume released in October 2016. The manga is licensed by Kazé in France.

Volume list

Anime

On December 2, 2020, Pony Canyon registered the "Anime-PlatinumEnd.com" domain name, and on December 19, 2020, at the Jump Festa '21 online event, it was announced that the series would receive an anime television series adaptation by Signal.MD. Hideya Takahashi directed the "first series", while Kazuchika Kise is directing the "second series", with series composition by Shin'ichi Inozume, and character designs by Kōji Ōdate. Masahiro Tokuda is composing the series' music. The series is listed for 24 episodes, and it aired on TBS, BS11, and other channels from October 8, 2021 to March 25, 2022. Band-Maid performed the opening theme "Sense", while Yuu Miyashita performed the first ending theme "Kōfuku-Ron" (Theory of Surrender). Kuhaku Gokko performed the second ending theme "Last Straw." Crunchyroll and Funimation licensed the series outside of Asia. Medialink licensed the series in South and Southeast Asia. Disney+ Hotstar started streaming the anime weekly in select Southeast Asian regions from January 5, 2022. On October 28, 2021, Crunchyroll announced the series would receive an English dub, which premiered on November 18 of the same year.

The series was released in Japan on DVD and Blu-ray across 4 volumes, each containing 6 episodes. The first volume was released on January 19, 2022; and each volume was released bi-monthly until July 20 of the same year.  In North America, Crunchyroll released the first 12 episodes of the series on Blu-Ray on January 10, 2023.

Reception
The first volume of Platinum End debuted at number two on Oricon's weekly list of the best-selling manga, with 105,213 copies sold. In December 2020, the manga had 4.5 million copies in circulation. When reviewing the opening chapter, Ian Wolf writing for Anime UK News compared Platinum End to Ohba and Obata's earlier series Death Note, saying: "the central character is a teenage boy fed up with life, who is guided by a supernatural force and given great power. Both leads seemingly find themselves on the path to becoming a deity. However, while Light Yagami uses his powers for diabolic ends, killing anyone he suspects of doing anything wrong while being observed by a shinigami, Mirai Kakehashi is guided by an apparently more benevolent force." He also writes that the series is an example of a death game, citing the death of one of the God candidates in the second chapter.

Writing for The Fandom Post Jarius Taylor gave the series a B+ rating and compared Platinum End to Future Diary writing: "while I don't have too much doubt it'll be stronger overall, the overt edginess here isn't something I was quite expecting from Ohba. Still, it's a pretty interesting read from beginning to end, and there's a lot of potential in terms of both thriller aspects and the overall theme. Hopefully, it'll be able to differentiate itself from Future Diary more going forward, but for now the idea of Ohba and Obata taking a crack at their own version of it seems pretty good to me."

Notes

References

External links
Platinum End official manga website 
Platinum End official anime website 

2015 manga
2021 anime television series debuts
2022 Japanese television series endings
Angels in television
Crunchyroll anime
Dark fantasy anime and manga
Fiction about death games
Fiction about suicide
Fiction about God
IG Port franchises
Shueisha manga
Shōnen manga
Signal.MD
Supernatural thriller anime and manga
Takeshi Obata
TBS Television (Japan) original programming
Viz Media manga